The 2007–08 season of the NOFV-Oberliga was the fourteenth and last season of the league at tier four (IV) of the German football league system before the introduction of the 3. Liga in Germany.

The NOFV-Oberliga was split into two divisions, NOFV-Oberliga Nord and NOFV-Oberliga Süd. The clubs finishing in the top three positions were promoted directly to the 2008–09 Regionalliga Nord.

North

Top goalscorers

South

Top goalscorers

External links 
 NOFV-Online – official website of the North-East German Football Association 

NOFV-Oberliga seasons
4